Diana Wieler (born October 14, 1961) is a Canadian writer of children's books.

The daughter of Jean Florence Zebrasky and Heinz Egon Petrich, she was born in Winnipeg, Manitoba and was educated there and in Calgary, Alberta. She attended the Southern Alberta Institute of Technology, taking a program in media arts. She worked in radio in Calgary and then for a newspaper in Saskatoon, Saskatchewan. She returned to Winnipeg where she now lives.

She married Larry Wieler; the couple has one son.

Selected books 
 Last Chance Summer (1986)
 Bad Boy (1991), received the Governor General's Award for English-language children's literature and the Canadian Library Association Young Adult Book Award
 RanVan the Defender (1993), received a Mr. Christie's Book Award
 RanVan: A Worthy Opponent (1995), was a finalist for a Governor General's Award
 To the Mountains By Morning (1995)

References 

1961 births
Living people
Canadian women children's writers
Governor General's Award-winning children's writers
Writers from Winnipeg